Talfourd Ely FSA (1838–1923) was a British archaeologist, classicist, and author of several books, notably A Manual of Archaeology and Roman Hayling.

Career
Talfourd Ely contributed many articles on archaeology to learned journals and taught Latin and other classical languages at University College London.

Family and friends
Talfourd Ely was a nephew of Francis (Frank) Talfourd, the dramatist, and a great-nephew of Sir Thomas Talfourd, author of “Ion.” In 1863 he married Sarah Ada Dawson, a daughter of John Dawson, Esq., Berrymead Priory, Acton. In the 1860s Henry Crabb Robinson was a lodger in the house of Mr. and Mrs. Ely in London at 30 Russell Square and was a family friend. Talfourd Ely was a grandson of John Towill Rutt, who was an early friend of Crabb Robinson.

Selected works

Articles

Books

as translator: 
 (See Hayling Island.)

References 

1838 births
1923 deaths
Academics of University College London
British archaeologists
Fellows of the Society of Antiquaries of London